The Edinburgh International Film Festival (EIFF), established in 1947, in is the world's oldest continually running film festival. EIFF presents both UK and international films (all titles are World, International, European, UK  or Scottish Premieres), in all genres and lengths. It also presents themed retrospectives and other specialized programming strands.

History
The International Festival of Documentary Films, a programme of documentaries, was presented by the Edinburgh Film Guild alongside the 1947 Edinburgh International Festival. At the time, Cannes and Venice were the most significant annual film festivals. Over the subsequent years, the programme expanded to include fiction films and experimental work in addition to documentaries. 

Linda Myles was director of the Festival from 1973-80, initiating a number of reappraisals and new viewpoints, notably "The Women's Event" organised by Myles, Claire Johnston and Laura Mulvey at the 1972 Festival.

In 2008, the film festival moved from its traditional August slot to June.

The film festival shows a range of feature-length films and documentaries as well as short films, animations and music videos. A jury awards The Michael Powell Award for Best New British Feature Film while the audience can vote for the Audience Award, and a panel of judges adjudicates the Best International Feature Award. There are also several awards given for short films.

The artistic director from September 2006 to 2010 was Hannah McGill, previously a film critic and cinema columnist for The Herald newspaper. Her predecessor, Shane Danielsen, served from 2002 to 2006. Tilda Swinton, Robert Carlyle and Seamus McGarvey are honorary patrons. In December 2009 Hannah McGill collected the prestigious Talkback Thames New Talent Award at the Women in Film and Television Awards.

Following McGill's departure, a new format was announced with no artistic director and a series of guest curators led by producer James Mullighan.

The Festival returned to a more conventional format in 2012 under artistic director Chris Fujiwara, who stepped down in 2014.

In 2014, the film critic/programmer Mark Adams – who had been Chief Film Critic for Screen International; Director of Cinema at the Institute of Contemporary Arts (ICA), and Head of Programme Planning at the National Film Theatre – took over as Artistic Director. He decided to step down after heading five editions in late 2019.

As of June 2021, the festival board introduced its newest creative director, Kristy Matheson, who formerly served as Director of Film at Australia's national museum of screen culture, ACMI. 

In October 2022, the festival's organiser, the Centre for the Moving Image, went into administration.

In March 2023, it was announced that the festival would return in a special one-year iteration as part of the Edinburgh International Festival, with the support of the Edinburgh International Festival in Screen Scotland. The 2023 programme will be led by EIFF’s new Programme Director Kate Taylor, with Kristy Matheson leaving the role. Full programme details for EIFF 2023 will be released in June 2023.

Venues
Edinburgh Filmhouse is the festival's home. The festival uses a range of other cinemas and venues across the city including Fountainpark Cineworld, Edinburgh Festival Theatre, VUE Cinema at the Omni Centre and the Odeon.

Film categories

 Opening and Closing Galas
 American Dreams – Cutting-edge new works from American independent cinema
 Animation – From the family-friendly to the deeply dark, the lo-fi to the super-sophisticated: all that's new in animation
 Black Box – Daring experiments in the film form, from out innovators of the visual art world
 Directors' Showcase – The latest works by the world's great auteur directors
 Films on Film – Explore the world of film-making and the lives of those who made film history
 For the Family – Films from around the world that children and adults can enjoy together
 New Perspectives – A global array of exciting new work by emerging directors
 No Limits – Films that challenge convention and stimulate the mind
 Shorts – Discover the world of short films – a universe with no laws, bounded only by the imagination
 Special Events – Exciting events, insightful discussions and chances to get up close and personal with some of cinema's greatest names
 Special Screenings – Classics from the archives and premieres of unique importance
 The Young and The Wild – A diverse selection of films hand-picked by EIFF's Young Programmer Team
 Wicker and Wild – Unpredictable journeys into imagination and terror

EIFF Awards
 The Michael Powell Award for Best British Feature Film, with a £20,000 cash prize
 The Award for Best Performance in a British Feature Film
 The Award for Best International Feature Film, with a £10,000 cash prize
 The Award for Best Documentary Feature Film, with a £10,000 cash prize
 The McLaren Award for Best New British Animation
 The Award for Best Short Film
 The Award for Creative Innovation in a Short Film
 The Award for Outstanding Individual Contribution to a Short Film
 The Audience Award

References

External links

 

Edinburgh Festival
Film festivals in Edinburgh
1947 establishments in Scotland
Film festivals established in 1947